Wilsaida Pieranlly Diaz Cesar (born in 1991) is a Dominican chess player. She is a Woman FIDE Master (WFM) since 2014. She is the best female player in the Dominican Republic and her highest rating was 1914 (in May 2016).

She won the Dominican Women championship in the years: 2013, 2015, and 2016.

She played on board 4 in the Women chess Olympiad in the years 2014, 2016 and 2018.

References

1991 births
Dominican Republic female chess players
Chess Olympiad competitors
Living people
Chess Woman FIDE Masters
21st-century Dominican Republic women